Orfeo Orfei (Massa Lombarda, 1836 - Bologna, 1915) was an Italian painter, mainly of genre working class subjects, at work or play, often in situations with touch of irony.

Biography
He was a resident of Bologna. Among his works are Il pittore di ventagli and L' ombrellaio. In 1888 at Bologna, he exhibited La conciliazione. He helped restore the frescoes of the Rocca Malatestiana in Cesena.

References

Bibliography 
 

1836 births
1915 deaths
Painters from Bologna
19th-century Italian painters
Italian male painters
20th-century Italian painters
Italian genre painters
19th-century Italian male artists
20th-century Italian male artists